Heiko Zinke is an East German sprint canoeist who competed in the mid-1980s. At the 1985 ICF Canoe Sprint World Championships in Mechelen, Belgium, he won a complete set of medals with a gold in K-4 500 m, a silver in K-1 1000 m, and a bronze in the K-4 1000 m events.

References

East German male canoeists
Living people
Year of birth missing (living people)
ICF Canoe Sprint World Championships medalists in kayak